Local elections were held in Romania in 1992 on 9 February (first round) and 23 February (second round). They were the first local elections after the 1989 Romanian Revolution and the first free local elections in the country since 1937.

Electoral map

References 

Local election, 1992
1992 elections in Romania
February 1992 events in Europe